La Cabrera (Cabreira in Leonese language) is a comarca (shire) in the province of León, Spain. Its surface is 115.87 km² and the population was 4,227 inhabitants in 2007. The Sierra de la Cabrera range dominates the landscape of this mountainous comarca.

Municipalities
 Benuza (Benuza)
 Castriellu de Cabreira (Castrillo de Cabrera)  
 Encinéu (Encinedo) 
 A Ponte de Domingos Flórez (Puente de Domingo Flórez) 
 Trueitas (Truchas)

Language

Leonese language is widely spoken in this shire, while Galician language is common in the western area.

See also
 León Province
 Leonese language

External links
Diario de León - La Cabrera, tal como era

Comarcas of the Province of León